At least two languages are known as Cua:
the Tsoa language, a Khoisan language of Botswana
the Cua language (Austroasiatic), one of the Bahnaric languages of Vietnam